M. C. Balan was an Indian politician and former Member of the Legislative Assembly. He was elected to the Tamil Nadu legislative assembly as a Dravida Munnetra Kazhagam candidate from Nagercoil constituency in Kanyakumari district in 1967 election. He was defeated by A. Chidambaranatha Nadar in 1962 election in Nagercoil legislative assembly constituency. He was defeated by  K. Kamaraj in Nagercoil parliamentary constituency in 1971 Indian general election.

References 

People from Kanyakumari district
Year of birth missing
Year of death missing
Members of the Tamil Nadu Legislative Assembly
Dravida Munnetra Kazhagam politicians